Love Guide for Dumpees, also known as A Dramatic Night, is a 2015 South Korean romantic comedy film directed by Ha Ki-ho. It was released on December 3, 2015.

Plot
At their ex's wedding, Jung-hoon (Wife's ex) meets Si-hoo (Groom's ex) at the reception and they fought over the last Salmon Sushi. Drunk Jung-hoon was driven home by Si-hoo who was determined to commit suicide at his house, as a form of revenge over his ex by taking different kinds of pills. Drunk Jung-hoon and drugged Si-hoo both had a one-night romp. One night turned into another, and Si-hoo decided they should fill the coffee coupon with 10 stamps (they already had 2) meeting each other just to have sex, after the 10th they could go separate ways.

Cast
Yoon Kye-sang as Jung-hoon
Han Ye-ri as Si-hoo
Park Hyo-joo as Joo-yun
Park Byung-eun as Joon-suk
Jung Soo-young as Teacher Kim
Kim Jae-hwa as Dol-sook
Oh Jung-se as Blind date man 3
Kim Eui-sung as Doctor
Jin Seon-kyu as Cafe man
Kim Chang-hwan as Studio part-time worker
Jo Bok-rae as Deok-rea
Kim Seo-won as Rescue worker

Reception
The film grossed  on its opening four days in South Korea.

References

External links

2015 romantic comedy films
South Korean romantic comedy films
2010s South Korean films
2010s Korean-language films